Flying Childers (1715–1741) was a famous undefeated 18th-century thoroughbred racehorse, foaled in 1714 at Carr House, Warmsworth, Doncaster, and is sometimes considered as the first truly great racehorse in the history of thoroughbreds and the first to catch the public imagination.

Breeding
Flying Childers was sired by the great Darley Arabian, one of the three foundation stallions of the thoroughbred breed. His dam, Betty Leedes, was by (Old) Careless, and she was inbred to Spanker in the second and third generations (2x3). Betty Leedes was also the dam of the unraced, but successful sire, Bartlett's or Bleeding Childers who was also by the Darley Arabian. (Old) Careless was by the great stallion Spanker, and both were thought to be the best racehorses of their generation. Betty Leedes was one of the few outside mares allowed to breed to the Darley Arabian, who was mostly kept as a private sire by his owner.

Racing record
Flying Childers gained the name of his breeder, Colonel Leonard Childers, in addition to his owner, the Duke of Devonshire, often being referred to as either Devonshire Childers or Flying Childers or sometimes simply Childers. Although the Duke received many offers for the colt, including one to pay for the horse's weight in gold, he remained the animal's owner throughout his life.

First racing at age six, the 15.2-hand colt won his maiden race, held April 1721 at Newmarket, to defeat Speedwell over four miles. He then won his second race in October, also at Newmarket, in a walk over, and his third race against Almanzor. It is said he completed this race, over the Round Course at Newmarket, in 6 minutes, 40 seconds and that he reached a speed of 82 1/2 feet per second or 1 mile per minute.  This was claimed to make Flying Childers the only horse on record as having matched the top speed of the unbeaten Eclipse.  By way of comparison, this would be nearly 40 seconds faster than the unbeaten Frankel ran the Newmarket Rowley Mile in his famous 2,000 Guineas victory of 2011, over 30 seconds faster than the current mile track record and very close to the five furlong track record set by Lochsong in 1994.

As a seven-year-old, he won his one start, a race at Newmarket where he beat Chaunter. In 1723, he won both his starts by walk over, one in April at Newmarket, the other a matchrace against Bobsey, who forfeited. Flying Childers then retired to stud.

Summary

Stud record
Flying Childers stood as a private stallion at the Duke's Chatsworth estate in Derbyshire, until his death in 1741 at  His offspring included several full-siblings from the Basto Mare: Blacklegs  a successful racehorse and sire for the Duke, Snip  a poor racehorse who sired the great stallion (Old) Snap, Second  who defeated both Sultan and Partner in 1737, Bay Basto (1729), Hip (1733), and Brown Basto (1738).

He also sired Spanking Roger (ch. 1732), who was undefeated against some of the best horses in the country except for one race where he threw his rider, Roundhead  Fleec'em, Steady, and Blaze  Blaze was especially important, producing Sampson, Scrub and Childers (owned by John Tayloe II of Mount Airy Stud), Shales (founding sire of the Norfolk Roadster, great influence on the Hackney) and Messenger, the founding sire of the Standardbred and very important in the Tennessee Walking Horse. Lastly, Flying Childers was the damsire of the important foundation Thoroughbred sire Herod.

He died in 1741, aged 26.  It was said he was "the fleetest horse that ever ran at Newmarket or, as generally believed, that was ever bred in the world".

Legacy
Such was the horse's fame that pubs were named after him, including at Bessacarr in his home town Doncaster, South Yorkshire, Stanton in Peak, Derbyshire, and Kirby Bellars, Leicestershire.

See also
 List of leading Thoroughbred racehorses

References

 Flying Childers on Thoroughbred Heritage site

External links
 Flying Childers' pedigree* http://etc.usf.edu/clipart/12600/12603/childers_12603.htm

1715 racehorse births
1741 racehorse deaths
Racehorses bred in the Kingdom of Great Britain
Racehorses trained in the Kingdom of Great Britain
Undefeated racehorses
Thoroughbred family 6-a